In Greek mythology, Hyrmine or Hyrmina was an Elean princess. The town of Hyrmine, named after her, was founded by her son Actor.

Family 
Hyrmina was the daughter of Neleus, Nycteus, or, according to others, of Epeius and Anaxiroe, and the sister of Alector (though others assert she was an only child). She was married to Phorbas and became the mother of the Argonauts Augeas, Actor, Tiphys and a daughter, Diogeneia.  

The natural father of Augeas by her may have been Helios. Otherwise, Helios and Nausidame or Eleios or Poseidon were called the parents of Augeas.

Notes

References 

 Apollodorus, The Library with an English Translation by Sir James George Frazer, F.B.A., F.R.S. in 2 Volumes, Cambridge, MA, Harvard University Press; London, William Heinemann Ltd. 1921. . Online version at the Perseus Digital Library. Greek text available from the same website.
Gaius Julius Hyginus, Fabulae from The Myths of Hyginus translated and edited by Mary Grant. University of Kansas Publications in Humanistic Studies. Online version at the Topos Text Project.
 Graves, Robert, The Greek Myths: The Complete and Definitive Edition. Penguin Books Limited. 2017. 
Pausanias, Description of Greece with an English Translation by W.H.S. Jones, Litt.D., and H.A. Ormerod, M.A., in 4 Volumes. Cambridge, MA, Harvard University Press; London, William Heinemann Ltd. 1918. . Online version at the Perseus Digital Library
 Pausanias, Graeciae Descriptio. 3 vols. Leipzig, Teubner. 1903.  Greek text available at the Perseus Digital Library.

Princesses in Greek mythology
Family of Calyce
Elean characters in Greek mythology
Women of Helios